The 1995 Arena Football League season was the ninth season of the Arena Football League (AFL). It was succeeded by 1996. The league champions were the Tampa Bay Storm, who defeated the Orlando Predators in ArenaBowl IX. The AFL realigned its divisions for the third straight year to two divisions per conference, a format that was then used until 2016.

Team movement
Five expansion teams formed in the league: the Connecticut Coyotes, Iowa Barnstormers, Memphis Pharaohs, St. Louis Stampede, and the San Jose SaberCats.

Meanwhile, both the Fort Worth Cavalry and the Massachusetts Marauders were suspended and the Cleveland Thunderbolts folded. The Denver Dynamite remained inactive.

Standings

Playoffs

All-Arena team

References